The Evangelical Lutheran Church of England (ELCE) is a confessional Lutheran synod in the United Kingdom. It has congregations in England, Wales and Scotland.

The ELCE's oldest congregations date back to 1896, and the ELCE itself was founded in 1954. It currently has 20 congregations and missions, and a seminary, Westfield House, in Cambridge. Together, there are about 900 baptized members.

The ELCE is a member of the European Lutheran Conference and of the International Lutheran Council.

Congregations

Greater London
 Holy Trinity Lutheran Church; Tottenham, London.
 Luther-Tyndale Memorial Church; Kentish Town. 
 St Andrew's Lutheran Church; Ruislip. 
 Christ Lutheran Church, Petts Wood. 
 St Paul's Lutheran Church; Borehamwood.

East of England
 Ascension; Brandon. 
 Resurrection Lutheran Church; Cambridge. 
 Redeemer Lutheran Church; Harlow.
 Ipswich Lutheran Mission.

South East England
 Our Saviour Lutheran Church; Fareham. 
 Brighton Lutheran Mission. 
 Oxford Lutheran Mission.
 Rainham Lutheran Mission.

South West England
 St Peter's Lutheran Church; Plymouth. 
 Bristol Lutheran Mission.
 Cheltenham Lutheran Mission.

West Midlands
 Good Shepherd Lutheran Church, Coventry.

North East England
 St Timothy's Lutheran Church, Sunderland.

Scotland
 St Columba Lutheran Church; East Kilbride.

Wales
 St David's Church, Fairwater; Cardiff.

Lutheran Radio UK 
The ELCE started broadcasting an internet-only radio station, Lutheran Radio UK, on March 4, 2012. The station features daily services, discussions, and music.

See also
Lutheran Church in Great Britain

References

External links 
ELCE website

Evangelicalism in the United Kingdom
Lutheranism in the United Kingdom
International Lutheran Council members
1954 establishments in England
Christian organizations established in 1954
Internet radio stations in the United Kingdom